Harry Sundberg (9 January 1898 – 16 May 1945) was a Swedish football player who competed in the 1924 Summer Olympics. He was a member of the Swedish team, which won the bronze medal in the football tournament.

Honours

Club 
 Djurgårdens IF 
 Svenska Mästerskapet: 1920

References

External links

Profile at databaseolympics.com

1898 births
1945 deaths
Swedish footballers
Footballers at the 1924 Summer Olympics
Olympic footballers of Sweden
Olympic bronze medalists for Sweden
Sweden international footballers
Djurgårdens IF Fotboll players
Olympic medalists in football
Medalists at the 1924 Summer Olympics
Association football midfielders